The Orto Botanico dell'Università di Sassari is a new building complex (still unfinished after several decades) now being constructed for the University of Sassari.  It is located between Via Piandanna and SP15m at the western edge of Sassari, Sardinia, Italy, and 
Unclear events have accompanied the history of this building complex: and at that time, after 2009, criminal investigations were initiated.

Notes

References 
 "Nuovo Orto botanico dell'Università di Sassari : presentazione del progetto in occasione del Convegno", in L'Orto botanico e il progetto ambientale della città contemporanea, Sassari : Dipartimento di botanica ed ecologia vegetale, Università di Sassari, 1995.  		  	
 Alghero Cronache Online article (Italian)

Buildings and structures in Sardinia
Sassari